is a Japanese former judoka who competed in the 1984 Summer Olympics. He was world finalist in 1986 in Maastricht, and won bronze in Moscow in 1983. He won five consecutive All Japan titles from 1980-1984; won the US Open and Hungarian Open titles; and in 1981, won the Kano Cup in Tokyo.

References

1952 births
Living people
Japanese male judoka
Olympic judoka of Japan
Judoka at the 1984 Summer Olympics
Olympic bronze medalists for Japan
Olympic medalists in judo
Medalists at the 1984 Summer Olympics
20th-century Japanese people
21st-century Japanese people